Alta Verapaz is a department in the north central part of Guatemala. The capital and chief city of the department is Cobán. Verapaz is bordered to the north by El Petén, to the east by Izabal, to the south by Zacapa, El Progreso, and Baja Verapaz, and to the west by El Quiché.

Also in Alta Verapaz are the towns of  Chisec, San Pedro Carchá and San Cristóbal Verapaz.

History
In Pre-Columbian times this area was part of the Maya civilization.  When the Spanish Conquistadores came in the 1520s they conquered the central and southern highlands of Guatemala, but were driven back from this region by fierce native resistance.  Unknown to the history books of this region, local oral history speaks of a former slave ship capsizing prior to the Spaniards arriving upon this area of Guatemala.  The former African slaves moved inland, and joined forces with the local indigenous people to fight and maintain their freedom. Spanish friars succeeded in converting the area to Christianity, and named the area "Verapaz" meaning "True Peace". In the 19th century this became an important coffee producing region as well as a sugar cane plantation during prior centuries. A museum exists today highlighting the sugar plantation history. In this region of Guatemala, families that trace back their heritage before the Spanish conquest, can trace back their Mayan features and curly hair to that local oral history. Majority of pre-Columbian heritage is seen with straight black hair throughout Guatemala.

The department was called Vera Paz by the British in the 19th century. In 1850, the department had an estimated population of 66,000.

As a result of the Mexican Drug War, the Los Zetas drug cartel members overtook much of the department and occupied many towns in December 2010. The Guatemalan government declared a state of siege on December 19, 2010, to reclaim the department, allowing the military and police forces to search and arrest any suspects without a warrant, and at least sixteen buildings were searched.

Municipalities 
 Chahal
 Chisec
 Cobán
 Fray Bartolomé de las Casas
 Lanquín
 Panzós
 Raxruha
 San Cristóbal Verapaz
 San Juan Chamelco
 San Pedro Carchá
 Santa Cruz Verapaz
 Santa María Cahabón
 Senahú
 Tactic
 Tamahú
 Tucurú
 Santa Catalina la Tinta

References

External links

 Chelemhá cloud forest reserve in Alta Verapaz, Guatemala
 Radio and Alta Verapaz, Guatemala - article by Don Moore

 
Departments of Guatemala